Fortress conservation is a conservation model based on the belief that biodiversity protection is best achieved by creating protected areas where ecosystems can function in isolation from human disturbance. Its implementation has been criticized for human rights abuses against indigenous inhabitants when creating and maintaining protected areas.

Background

Ecotourism

It is argued that money generated from ecotourism is the motivating factor to drive indigenous inhabitants off the land.

Efficacy

While the fortress conservation model views human as being inherently destructive to the environment, some have argued that the most efficient conservation methods involve transferring rights over land from public domain to its indigenous inhabitants, who have had a stake for millennia in preserving the forests that they depend on.  This includes the protection of such rights entitled in existing laws, such as the Forest Rights Act in India, where concessions to land continue to go mostly to powerful companies. The transferring of such rights in China, perhaps the largest land reform in modern times, has been argued to have increased forest cover. Granting title of the land has shown to have two or three times less clearing than even state run parks, notably in the Brazilian Amazon. Even while the largest cause of deforestation in the world's second largest rainforest in the Congo is smallholder agriculture and charcoal production, areas with community concessions have significantly less deforestation as communities are incentivized to manage the land sustainably, even reducing poverty. Additionally, evicting inhabitants from protected areas often under the fortress conservation model often leads to more exploitation of the land as the native inhabitants then turn to work for extractive companies to survive.

Militarization
Conservation charities, the biggest of which is the World Wildlife Fund have increasingly militarized the campaign against poaching. Such poaching is often by organized criminal gangs that prey on the endangered species and, in 2018, 50 park rangers were killed globally. Veterans from the wars in Afghanistan and Iraq have been recruited to teach forest rangers counterinsurgency techniques and ex–special forces operatives promote their services at wildlife conferences. This has often involved recruiting paramilitary groups who are then supplied with military grade weaponry.

Prevalence

Up to 250,000 people worldwide have been forcibly evicted from their homes to make way for conservation projects since 1990, according to the UN special rapporteur on the rights of indigenous peoples.

Botswana

In Botswana, many of the indigenous San people have been forcibly relocated from their land to reservations. To make them relocate, they were denied access to water on their land and faced arrest if they hunted, which was their primary source of food. The government claims the relocation is to preserve the wildlife and ecosystem, even though the San people have lived sustainably on the land for millennia. Additionally, their lands lie in the middle of the world's richest diamond field. On the reservations they struggle to find employment, and alcoholism is rampant.

Cameroon
Baka people in Cameroon's Lobéké National Park have alleged abuse by park rangers funded by the World Wildlife Fund (WWF).

Democratic Republic of the Congo
In national parks in the Democratic Republic of the Congo, such as Kahuzi-Biéga National Park, heavily armed park rangers come into deadly conflict with the pygmy inhabitants who often cut the trees down to sell charcoal. The conservation efforts of national parks in the country are often financed by international organizations such as the WWF and often involve removing native inhabitants off the land.

Nepal
The creation of Chitwan National Park in the 1970s led to tens of thousands of indigenous Tharu people to be evicted. The World Wildlife Fund has been accused of providing high-tech enforcement equipment, cash, and weapons to rangers involved torturing Tharu living near national parks such as Bardiya National Park. Nepalese law was changed to give forest rangers the power to investigate wildlife-related crimes, make arrests without a warrant, and retain immunity in cases where an officer had “no alternative” but to shoot the offender while the park's chief warden has the power to hand out 15-year prison terms by themselves.

Republic of the Congo
Forest rangers, known as ecoguards, dressed in paramilitary uniforms and heavily armed with funding from the WWF, are accused of torture, rape and murder of Baka pygmies in the proposed Messok Dja protected area as part of an effort to remove the Baka pygmies from the area.

Tanzania
More than 150,000 Maasai people face eviction in Tanzania with moves to turn their lands into nature reserves for luxury safari tourism and for trophy hunting in the Ngorongoro Conservation Area, which is a UNESCO World Heritage Site, and in Loliondo near the Serengeti National Park. Previous attempts to forcefully evict the Maasai have alleged to have included burning their homes.

United States of America
The preservation of Yosemite National Park under the advocacy of John Muir meant the expulsion of the Miwok and Paiute Native Americans.

See also
Ecotourism
Green grabbing
World Wide Fund for Nature#Human rights abuses by paramilitaries

References

Ecotourism
Indigenous rights
Nature conservation
Neocolonialism
World Wide Fund for Nature